Luís Reñé Padrisa (18 September 1889 - 2 July 1963), born Lluís and sometimes spell as Renyé, was a Spanish footballer who played as a goalkeeper for FC Barcelona. He was the first goalkeeper in Barcelona's history to establish himself as an indisputable starter. In addition to being a footballer, he excelled in athletics, a sport in which he was champion of Catalonia in the discus throw in 1912).

The highlight of his career was winning the treble with Barcelona in the 1912–13 season (Catalan championship, Copa del Rey and Pyrenees Cup), in which he played a decisive role.

Club career
Born in Catalonia, he joined the first team of Ibèric FC during the 1907-08 season as a defender. It was only at FC Català when he began to play as a goalkeeper, and he went on to play in that position for fellow Catalan clubs Espanyol and FC Espanya. In these clubs, he stood out for his ability to punch away high balls and for his great reflexes. He also had a great physique, with a height much higher than most players of the time. Eventually, his performance drew the attention of FC Barcelona, who signed him in 1911. Shortly after, he was involved in a controversy regarding Barça's line-up in the 1911 Copa del Rey: Barcelona defeated Sociedad Gimnástica 4 to 0, but Gimnástica Española complained about the presence of English players Percy and Charles Wallace, and of Luis Reñé, who had played with FC Espanya less than a month ago, and the regulations of the time did not allow players to play in two different teams in such a short space of time. Faced with this complaint, the Football Federation ordered the match to be replayed, but Barcelona refused to do it claiming the line-up of English players in Athletic Bilbao, so Barcelona was disqualified and Gimnástica Española qualified for the semi-finals.

In the following season, Reñé and Barcelona got their revenge when they beat Sociedad Gimnástica in the 1912 Copa del Rey Final, in which Reñé kept a clean-sheet in a 2–0 victory, thus contributing decisively in the Catalan's triumph. Their victory over Gimnástica also sealed a treble, as they had helped Barça win the 1911–12 Catalan championship and the 1912 Pyrenees Cup. Reñé was once again the starting goalkeeper of a Barcelona Copa del Rey winning squad when he featured in all three games of the Copa del Rey Final (UECF) against Real Sociedad. In his last season at Barça (1913–14), he lost his place in the side to new-signing Luis Bru, thus featuring mainly as a substitute. He then moved to University SC, finishing his career in 1915.

International career
Like many other FC Barcelona of his time, he played several matches for the Catalan national team, being one of the eleven footballers who played in the team's first-ever game recognized by FIFA on 20 February 1912, which ended in a 0–7 loss to France.

Honours
Barcelona
Catalan championship:
Champions (1): 1912–13

Pyrenees Cup:
Champions (2): 1912 and 1913

Copa del Rey:
Champions (2): 1912 and 1913

References

1889 births
1963 deaths
Footballers from Barcelona
Spanish footballers
Association football goalkeepers
FC Barcelona players
RCD Espanyol footballers
Catalonia international footballers